St. Brigid's Church is a Roman Catholic church in Foxley River, PEI, Canada. It is part of the Roman Catholic diocese of Charlottetown

History
Prior to 1870, residents of Lot 11 traveled to St. Anthony parish, Cascumpeque, a journey which involved a ferry crossing and nine miles travel over land, or in winter time, a horse and sleigh ride across the ice. In 1868, under the guidance of their first priest Rev. James Aeneas McDonald (1820- ?), the Catholic settlers of Lot 11 started construction on the church.  It was completed in 1873, although by Christmas Eve 1870, construction was far enough advanced that midnight mass was offered on a temporary altar.
 
The name for the church was chosen due to the predominantly Irish pioneer settlement of the area. St. Brigid was a 5th Century Irish saint.
In 1914 a sacristy was added to the church. 
In 1931 the spire was struck by lightning. During the repairs a new copper cross was added. 
Since 1982 there has been no resident priest. Services are conducted by Fr. Danny Wilson, Pastor of St. Anthony's, Bloomfield, PEI.
In 2003 the church was officially recognized as a Registered Historic Place under the Heritage Places Protection Act of Prince Edward Island.

  
Since 1870 the church has held an annual picnic every summer.

Architecture
 The architect was John McLellan, who also designed St. Joachim's Roman Catholic church at Vernon River, PEI and St. Joseph's convent in Charlottetown, PEI
. The builder was Jeremiah Dalton.  The church has a Gothic Revival style with a central tower capped with an elaborate pointed spire topped with a cross. The roof of the spire has decorative high narrow dormers on each of its four sides. Extensive renovations were made to the building in 1913–14, when a side vestry was added.

The church measures sixty feet in length by thirty feet in width. The walls are 22 feet high. The interior is completely covered in wood paneling. Two stained glass windows decorate the altar, one depicting St. Brigid and one depicting St. Patrick.

Notes

External links 

Roman Catholic churches in Prince Edward Island
Heritage sites in Prince Edward Island
Churches in Prince County, Prince Edward Island
Roman Catholic churches completed in 1873
19th-century churches in Canada